Bajramath Temple is a Jain temple located in Gyaraspur town of Vidisha in state of Madhya Pradesh, India.

About temple 
Bajramath Temple is famous for carvings and craftmanship, and are representative of post-Gupta architecture. This temple enshrines three garbhagrihas with the temple is fully decorated with Jain sculptures. The large mandapa is supported by 16 pillars, balcony on each side and a staircase on east. The temple was earlier a Brahmical temple dedicate to Surya but was transformed to a Jain temple which is evident from carvings of Hindu God Surya, Shiva and Vishnu on door jambs. The temple houses an idol of Surya on seven-horse chariot with Brahma and Vishnu on side. All three shrines of this temple are now occupied with idols of Tirthankaras. The temple houses a finely carved five–hooded idol of Suparshvanatha.

Photo gallery

Restoration 
Maladevi temple in Vidisha is protected by Archaeological Survey of India.

See also 
 Jain temples, Vidisha
 Gadarmal Devi temple
 Maladevi Temple
 Udayagiri Caves

References

Citations

Sources

External links 
 

Jain temples in Madhya Pradesh
9th-century Jain temples